Symarip (also known at various stages of their career as The Bees, The Pyramids, Seven Letters and Zubaba) were a British ska and reggae band, originating in the late 1960s, when Frank Pitter and Michael Thomas founded the band as The Bees. The band's name was originally spelled Simaryp, which is an approximate reversal of the word pyramids. Consisting of members of West Indian descent, Simaryp is widely marked as one of the first skinhead reggae bands, being one of the first to target skinheads as an audience. Their hits included  "Skinhead Girl", "Skinhead Jamboree" and "Skinhead Moonstomp", the latter based on the Derrick Morgan song, "Moon Hop".

They moved to Germany in 1971, performing reggae and Afro-rock under the name Zubaba. In 1980, the single "Skinhead Moonstomp" was re-issued in the wake of the 2 Tone craze, hitting No. 54 on the UK Singles Chart. The band officially split in 1985 after releasing the album Drunk & Disorderly as The Pyramids. The album was released by Ariola Records and was produced by Stevie B.

Pitter and Ellis moved back to England, where Ellis continued performing as a solo artist, sometimes using the stage name 'Mr. Symarip'. Mike Thomas met a Finnish woman while living in Switzerland and relocated to Finland doing the groundwork for the Finnish reggae culture through his band 'Mike T. Saganor'. Monty Neysmith moved to the United States, where he toured as a solo artist.

In 2004, Trojan Records released a best of album including a new single by Neysmith and Ellis, "Back From the Moon". In 2005, Neysmith and Ellis performed together at Club Ska in England, and a recording of the concert was released on Moon Ska Records as Symarip – Live at Club Ska. In April 2008, they headlined the Ska Splash Festival in Lincolnshire as Symarip, and later performed at the Endorse-It and Fordham Festivals. Pitter and Thomas now perform in a different band as Symarip Pyramid. Their Back From The Moon Tour 2008–2009 was with The Pioneers. In 2009, to celebrate the rebirth of the band and the reunion of the two original members, Trojan Records released a compilation album, Ultimate Collection. Pitter holds all copyright and trademark rights for the name 'Symarip Pyramid'.

Line-up
Roy Ellis – singer, trombone (1969–1985)
Josh Roberts – guitar (1969–1985)
Michael "Mik" Thomas – bass guitar (1969 – 1985, 2008 – present)
Frank Pitter – drums (1969 – 1985, 2008 – present)
Monty Neysmith – keyboards, including Hammond organ (1969 – 1985, 2010 – present)
Roy Bug Knight – saxophone (2008 – present)
Johney Johnson – trumpet (2008 – present)
Carl Grifith  – tenor and alto saxophone (2008 – present)

Partial discography

Albums
The Pyramids – The Pyramids – President – PTL-1021 (1968) 	
Symarip – Skinhead Moonstomp – Trojan – TBL-102 (1970)
Simaryp – Skinhead Moonstomp – Trojan – TRLS187 (1980)
The Pyramids – Drunk and Disorderly – Ariola (1985)
Symarip/The Pyramids/Seven Letters – The Best Of – Trojan TJACD154 (2004)
Symarip/The Pyramids – Ultimate Collection – Trojan (2009)

Singles
Blue Beat BB-386A "Jesse James Rides Again" (as The Bees) 1967
Blue Beat BB-386B "The Girl in My Dreams" (as The Bees) 1967
Clmbia Blue Beat DB-101A "Jesse James Rides Again" (as The Bees) 1967
Clmbia Blue Beat DB-101B "The Girl in My Dreams" (as The Bees) 1967
Clmbia Blue Beat DB-111A "Prisoner from Alcatraz" (as The Bees) 1967
Clmbia Blue Beat DB-111B "The Ska's The Limit" (as The Bees) 1967
President PT-161A "Train Tour To Rainbow City" 1967
President PT-161B "John Chewey" 1967
President PT-177A "Wedding in Peyton Place" 1968
President PT-177B "Girls, Girls, Girls" 1968
President PT-195A "All Change on the Bakerloo Line" 1968
President PT-195B "Playing Games" 1968
President PT-206A "Mexican Moonlight" 1968
President PT-206B "Mule" 1968
President PT-225A "Tisko My Darling" 1968
President PT-225B "Movement All Around" 1968
President PT-243A "Do Re Mi" 1969
President PT-243B "I'm Outnumbered" 1969
President PT-274A "I'm a Man" 1969
President PT-274B "Dragonfly" 1969
Attack ATT-8013A "I'm A Puppet" (as Symarip) 1969
Attack ATT-8013B "Vindication" (as Symarip) 1969
Doctor Bird DB-1189A "People Get Ready" (as Seven Letters) 1969
Doctor Bird DB-1189B "The Fit" (as Seven Letters) 1969
Doctor Bird DB-1194A "Please Stay" (as Seven Letters) 1969
Doctor Bird DB-1194B "Special Beat" (as Seven Letters) 1969
Doctor Bird DB-1195A "Flour Dumpling" (as Seven Letters) 1969
Doctor Bird DB-1195B "Equality" (as Seven Letters) 1969
Doctor Bird DB-1206A "Mama Me Want Girl" (as Seven Letters) 1969
Doctor Bird DB-1206B "Sentry" (as Seven Letters) 1969
Doctor Bird DB-1207A "Soul Crash (Soul Serenade)" (as Seven Letters) 1969
Doctor Bird DB-1207B "Throw Me Things" (as Seven Letters) 1969
Doctor Bird DB-1208A "There Goes My Heart" (as Seven Letters) 1969
Doctor Bird DB-1208B "Wish" (as Seven Letters) 1969
Doctor Bird DB-1209A "Bam Bam Baji" (as Seven Letters) 1969
Doctor Bird DB-1209B "Hold Him Joe" (as Seven Letters) 1969
Doctor Bird DB-1306A "Fung Sure" (as Simaryp) 1969
Doctor Bird DB-1306B "Tomorrow at Sundown" (as Simaryp) 1969
Doctor Bird DB-1307A "Stay With Him" 1969
Doctor Bird DB-1307B "Chicken Mary" 1969
Treasure Isle TI-7050A "Skinhead Moonstomp" 1969
Treasure Isle TI-7050B "Must Catch A Train" 1969
Treasure Isle TI-7054A "Parson's Corner" 1970
Treasure Isle TI-7054B "Redeem" 1970
Treasure Isle TI-7055A "La Bella Jig" 1970
Treasure Isle TI-7055B "Holiday by the Sea" 1970
Attack ATT-8013A "I'm A Puppet" 1970
Attack ATT-8013B "Vindication" 1970
Duke DU-80A "Geronimo" 1970
Duke DU-80B "Feel Alright" 1970
Trojan TR-7755A "Feel Alright" 1970
Trojan TR-7755B "Telstar" 1970
Trojan TR-7770A "To Sir With Love" 1970
Trojan TR-7770B "Reggae Shuffle" 1970
Trojan TR-7803A "All For You" 1971
Trojan TR-7803B "All For You" (version) 1971
Trojan TR-7814B (1) "Stingo" 1971
Trojan TR-7814B (2) "Geronimo" 1971
Creole CR-1003A "Mosquito Bite"
Creole CR-1003B "Mother's Bath"
Creole CR-1006A "Can't Leave Now"
Creole CR-1006B "Teardrops"
Rhino RNO-129A "Jesse James Rides Again" 1974

References

External links
Biography on Trojan Records site
Mr. Symarip – Roy Ellis
Interview with Symarip member
Symarip discography
Symarip Pyramids Myspace profile
Interview wirh Roy Ellis on Litopia

First-wave ska groups
British reggae musical groups
British ska musical groups
Skinhead
Trojan Records artists
Blue Beat Records artists